Jerry O'Neil (born May 10, 1943) was a Republican member of the Montana Legislature. He served in the Montana Senate from 2000 to 2008. He was then elected to House District 3 representing the Columbia Falls area. In 2014, he lost the seat to Zac Perry in the general election. He filed for election in 2018, but was subsequently defeated.

Personal life
O’Neil was born in Kalispell, Montana, in 1943, where his family owned a lumber yard. After graduating from Flathead High School in 1961, he attended Montana State University at Bozeman, University of Montana at Missoula, and FVCC in Kalispell.

See also 
 Montana House of Representatives, District 3

References

External links
Home page

Living people
1943 births
Republican Party members of the Montana House of Representatives
Republican Party Montana state senators
Politicians from Kalispell, Montana
People from Columbia Falls, Montana